Janine Burke is an Australian author, art historian, biographer, photographer and novelist. She also curates exhibitions of historical and contemporary art. She is Honorary Senior Fellow, Faculty of Fine Arts and Music, University of Melbourne. She was born in Melbourne in 1952.

Education
Burke attended Catholic Ladies College, East Melbourne (1965-1967) before being expelled. She then attended Malvern Girls High School (1967-1970). She won a Commonwealth Government Scholarship which enabled her to attend the University of Melbourne. She graduated in 1974 with a Bachelor of Arts (Hons), majoring in art history. In 1986 she was awarded a Master of Arts at La Trobe University, and a PhD from Deakin University in 2002.

Career

1970s-1980s
In 1973, Burke began to publish art reviews and essays. The following year, she co-curated A Room of One's Own: Three Women Artists, perhaps Australia's first feminist group exhibition with Lynne Cook and Kiffy Rubbo, director of the George Paton Gallery, University of Melbourne. In 1975, Burke was a founding member of the Women's Art Movement in Melbourne. She was commissioned by Rubbo to curate Australian Women Artists: 1840-1940. A national touring exhibition, it became a best-selling book in 1980. 

In 1975, she was a founding member of the feminist arts journal Lip.

Burke was the foundation art history lecturer at the Victorian College of the Arts from 1977-1982. She resigned to become a professional writer and independent scholar.

In 1983, after the publication of Joy Hester, Burke left Australia for Tuscany. She had a residency at Paretaio, the house of Australian artist Arthur Boydsituated near Palaia, halfway between Pisa and Florence. Judith Blackall, had established the Boyd home as a studio and residency for artists, administered by the Australia Council for the Arts. Artists resident around the same time as Burke included Janet Laurence, Elizabeth Gower, John R. Neeson and Domenico de Clario.

Burke completed her first novel, Speaking (1984), and began her next novel, Second Sight, which won the 1987 Victorian Premier's Literary Award for fiction. She moved to Florence where she studied Italian at the British Institute. In 1984, she sojourned in Paris, returning to Australia for the publication of Speaking. In 1986, she was a writer-in-residence in Hobart and in 1989 at the University of New England, Armidale. In the mid-80s, she settled in Robe Street, St Kilda, where Joy Hester and Albert Tucker had lived in the 1940s. She continued to write fiction, both novels and short stories, as well as contributing art reviews and essays to journals and newspapers. Burke was an advisory editor to art and literary journals including Meanjin, Island, Art and Australia and Imprint.

1990s
Burke has judged literary awards, including the Hazel Rowley Literary Fellowship and The Age Book of the Year award. Between 1994-1997, she was a member of the programming committee of the Melbourne Writers Festival.

In 1995, Burke published Dear Sun: The Letters of Joy Hester and Sunday Reed, the correspondence between Hester and arts patron Sunday Reed. Tucker made his photographs available for Burke to illustrate the book. Sunday, Hester's closest friend, had adopted Hester's son, Sweeney. In 1981, Sunday and John Reed's home and their art collection became the Heide Museum of Modern Art. When Burke was a lecturer at the Victorian College of the Arts, Sweeney, an artist and a former gallery director, was a mature age student in the printmaking department. Sweeney assisted Burke with her research on Hester. In 1979, Sweeney took his own life.

2000s
From 1996-2004, Burke was a trustee of Heide MoMA. She was a member of the committee which oversaw the restoration of Heide I, the Reed's original home on the property, which opened to the public in 2001. Burke's biography of Tucker, written with Tucker's approval, ran into strife prior to its publication in 2002. Tucker died in 1999 without reading the manuscript. Australian Gothic, A Life of Albert Tucker was Burke's doctoral dissertation and the first biography of Tucker. Tucker's widow, Barbara, objected to the book and refused to allow copyright permission to reproduce his paintings. The book was illustrated with Tucker's photographs which were not subject to copyright, as they were taken before the 1950s. In 1998, Burke had curated the first major exhibition of Tucker's photographs, titled The Eye of the Beholder: Albert Tucker's Photographs which toured nationally. Controversially, in Australian Gothic, Burke wrote it was unlikely that Sweeney was the son of Albert Tucker, but rather of well-known Melbourne drummer Billy Hyde (1918–1976). Burke based her comments on conversations with Tucker, Sweeney, Gray Smith (Hester's second husband) and Nadine Amadio, a close friend of Sunday Reed's. In late 2001, when the row about the book made news, Ken Fletcher, chairman of the Heide board, asked Burke to resign. It was believed that the Tucker Gift to Heide MoMA, administered by Tucker's widow, was in jeopardy. The gift was worth several million dollars and comprised works by Tucker, Hester, Boyd, Sidney Nolan and Danila Vassilieff. Burke refused to leave the board and the Tucker Gift went ahead. The controversy is discussed by Katrina Strickland in Affairs of the Art: Love, Loss and Power in the Artworld (2013).

The Heart Garden: Sunday Reed and Heide (2004) takes its title from a small, heart-shaped garden of forget-me-nots and chamomile that Reed planted to commemorate her relationship with Sidney Nolan. In the biography, Burke wrote that Reed had assisted Nolan in painting the Ned Kelly series. She based her theory on the close collaborative relationship that Reed and Nolan enjoyed, evidenced by archival research, and by Nolan's watercolour  For the one who paints such beautiful squares (c.1946-1947, Heide MoMA) that is dedicated to Sunday. Currently, with film producer Richard Keddie, Burke is consultant to a film project about Heide, based upon her books.

2004-2016
After visiting the Freud Museum London where Sigmund Freud's art collection of over 2000 antiquities is housed, Burke wrote The Gods of Freud: Sigmund Freud's Art Collection (2006) which was shortlisted for the NSW Premier's Literary Award. In 2007, with the co-operation of Freud Museum London, she curated "An Archaeology of the Mind: Sigmund Freud's Art Collection" for Monash University Museum of Art and the Nicholson Museum, University of Sydney. Burke has also curated "Freud and Eros: Love, Lust and Longing" at the Freud Museum London in 2014.

In 2011, Burke staged a photography exhibition, Personal View: Photographs 1978-1986, at VCA Margaret Lawrence Gallery, Melbourne. A book of the same name was published by Monash University Publishing to coincide with the exhibition.

Nest: The Art of Birds (Allen & Unwin 2012) was also an exhibition of the same title which Burke curated for McClelland Sculpture Park and Gallery in 2013. The nests were selected from the collection of Museum Victoria and the private collection of Gay Bilson.

With Adrian Martin, she organised "Impresario: Paul Taylor Art & Text POPISM" at Monash University in 2012. Edited by Helen Hughes and Nicholas Croggan, the papers were published as Impresario: Paul Taylor The Melbourne Years 1981-1984(2013).

In 2014, Burke organised the conference "Kiffy Rubbo and the George Paton Gallery: Curating the 1970s" at the University of Melbourne. In 2016, she co-edited a book of the same name with Helen Hughes.

Awards, nominations and competitive grants
 Australia Council for the Arts Established Writers Grant (2014)
 Monash University Research Fellowship (2009-2013)
 Shortlisted 2007 NSW Premier's Literary Award for Non-fiction The Gods of Freud: Sigmund Freud's Art Collection
 Shortlisted 2003 Queensland Premier's Award for Non-Fiction Australian Gothic: A Life of Albert Tucker
 Shortlisted 1990 for Miles Franklin Award, Company of Images
 Shortlisted 1990 The Age Book of the Year Award, Company of Images
 Winner 1987 Victorian Premier's Literary Award, Vance Palmer Prize for Fiction Second Sight

Publications: books

Non-fiction books and art exhibition catalogues
 Australian Women Artists: 1840-1940 (1980)
 Joy Hester (1983:revised and republished 2001)
 Field of Vision, A Decade of Change: Women's Art in the Seventies (1990)
 Dear Sun: The Letters of Joy Hester and Sunday Reed [Ed.](1995)
 The Eye of the Beholder: Albert Tucker's Photographs (1998) Heide Museum of Modern Art
 Australian Gothic: A Life of Albert Tucker (2002)
 The Heart Garden: Sunday Reed and Heide (2004)
 The Gods of Freud: Sigmund Freud's Art Collection (2006) [published in the US as The Sphinx on the Table: Sigmund Freud's Art Collection and the Development of Psychoanalysis]
 Sigmund Freud's Collection: An Archaeology of the Mind [Essay and Catalogue] (2007) Monash University of Modern Art
 Source: Nature's Healing Role in Art and Writing (2009)
 Personal View: Photographs 1978 - 1986 (2011) with an essay by Anne Marsh
 Nest: The Art of Birds (2012)
 Freud and Eros: Love, Lust and Longing (2014) Essay and catalogue of works by JB. Freud Museum London
 Kiffy Rubbo: Curating the 1970s (2016) Co-edited with Helen Hughes
 Human/Animal/Artist: Art Inspired by Animals (2016) Curated and with essay by Burke. Catalogue of artworks by Penny Teale. McClelland Sculpture Park + Gallery
My Forests: Travels with Trees (2021)

Fiction (adult)
 Speaking (1984)
 Second Sight (1986)
 Company of Images (1989)
 Lullaby (1994)

Fiction (young adult)
 Journey to Bright Water (1994)
 The Blue Faraway (1996)
 The Doll (1997) 
 Our Lady of Apollo Bay (2001)

Exhibitions curated
 A Room of One's Own : Three Women Artists (1974: co-curated with Kiffy Rubbo and Lynne Cook) Ewing Gallery, University of Melbourne.
 Australian Women Artists, One Hundred Years, 1840-1940 (1975) Ewing Gallery and George Paton Galleries, University of Melbourne; Art Gallery of NSW; Newcastle Region Art Gallery; Art Gallery of South Australia.
 Still Lives: Eight Women Realists (1978) Victorian College of the Arts Gallery, Melbourne.
 Lost and Found: Objects and Images (1978) Ewing Gallery and George Paton Galleries, University of Melbourne.
 Self-Portrait, Self-Image (1980) Victorian College of the Arts Gallery, Melbourne and tour.
 Bea Maddock: Survey Show (1980) National Gallery of Victoria.
 Joy Hester (1981) National Gallery of Victoria.
 The Eye of the Beholder: Albert Tucker's Photographs (1998) Heide Museum of Modern Art and tour.
 The Heart Garden: A Portrait of Sunday Reed at Heide (2004) Heide Museum of Modern Art.
 An Archaeology of the Mind: Sigmund Freud's Art Collection (2007–2008) Monash University Museum of Art; Nicholson Museum, University of Sydney.
 Nest: The Art of Birds. (2013) McClelland Sculpture Park + Gallery.
 Freud and Eros: Love, Lust and Longing. (2014-2015) Freud Museum, London.
 Human/Animal/Artist: Art Inspired by Animals (2016-2017) McClelland Sculpture Park + Gallery.

Exhibitions
 Personal View: Photographs 1978-1986, Margaret Lawrence VCA Gallery, Melbourne, 20 May–11 June 2011.

Burke papers and photograph collections 
 Australian feminist art timeline

Burke's papers are in the collections of the State Library of Victoria and the University of New South Wales Library, Canberra. Her photographs are in the collections of the National Gallery of Australia Library, Heide Museum of Modern Art and Monash University of Modern Art.

Notes

References
 Debra Adelaide, Australian women writers: a bibliographic guide, London, Pandora, 1988.
 Roberta Buffi, Between Literature and Painting: Three Australian Women Writers, Peter Lang, New York, 2002.

Living people
Australian women novelists
20th-century Australian novelists
Australian art historians
Women art historians
University of Melbourne alumni
University of Melbourne women
La Trobe University alumni
Deakin University alumni
20th-century Australian women writers
Australian women historians
Year of birth missing (living people)
Writers from Melbourne